Eriline was a post office in Clay County, Kentucky, United States from 1902-12-09 to 1988, with a 32-year hiatus from 1911.
It was supposed to be named after Eveline (some sources spell as Evaline) Britton (1861–1939), wife of Van Britton (1855–1911) its first postmaster, but the clerks at the USPS could not read the handwriting on the application form, naming it Eriline instead, and the Brittons did not consider it important enough to make a fuss about the name.

It was originally established at the Brittons' home at the mouth of Hector Creek (on Red Bird River), but moved three times.
The first move was to the east side of the Red Bird River, south of the mouth of Big Creek, which was the result of its reëstablishment after the hiatus on 1943-08-29 by George C. Hensley.
The second move was back north in 1944 by Mary W. Bowling to the west of the Red Bird, 2 miles from the then Jacks Creek post office.
The third move took it upriver in 1949, and at its closure in 1988 it was still on the west side of the Red Bird, at the junction of Kentucky Route 66 and Jacks Creek Road.

Cross-reference

Sources 

 
 

Unincorporated communities in Clay County, Kentucky
Unincorporated communities in Kentucky